Francis Marion Ownbey (29 September 1910 - 1974) was an American botanist.

Ownbey earned his Ph.D. at the Washington University in St. Louis, with Jesse M. Greenman. Ownbey began to teach at Washington State University in 1939, and became director of the herbarium. During World War II, he was sent to Ecuador as part of the Cinchona Missions.

Ownbey was especially interested in the genus Tragopogon. He was awarded a Guggenheim fellowship in 1954 for his investigation into the genetics of the genus.

He died in 1974, and the herbarium at WSU was named in his honor. His brother, was also a published botanist.

Select publications

Books 

 Francis Marion Ownbey, Hannah Caroline Aase. 1955. Cytotaxonomic studies in Allium. p. 1-3, Research Studies of the State College of Washington: Monographic supplement. Editor State College of Washington, 106 pp.
 Francis Marion Ownbey. 1939. A monograph of the genus Calochortus. Editor Washington Univ. 670 pp.

References 

University of Washington faculty
American botanists
Botanists with author abbreviations
1910 births
1974 deaths
Washington University in St. Louis alumni